Edward Buller may refer to:

Sir Edward Buller, 1st Baronet (1764 – 1824), politician and vice-admiral in the Royal Navy 
Sir Edward Manningham-Buller, 1st Baronet (1800–1882), politician
Ed Buller, British record producer and musician
Edward Buller, pen-name of popular fiction writer Edward Y. Breese

See also
Buller (surname)